The Heartland model (or "Heartland theory") of Book of Mormon geography postulates that the events described in the Book of Mormon took place, primarily, in the heartland of North America.

Among the model's proposals are that Mound Builders, including the Hopewell and the Adena, were among those peoples described in accounts of events in Book of Mormon books such as Alma and Helaman. The Mississippi River is identified as the River Sidon, and Big Spring (in Carter County, Missouri) as the Waters of Mormon. The Niagara Falls region has been described as the "narrow neck of land" mentioned in Alma. In addition, the Appalachian region of Tennessee is claimed by some to be the Land of Nephi.

In this model, the Hill Cumorah is located in upstate New York. It is the same hill referenced in the Book of Mormon as the location of the destruction of both the Jaredite (Adena) and Nephite (Hopewell) peoples, and the same hill in which the prophet Mormon hides the sacred records, and from which his resurrected son, Moroni, delivers the records to the Prophet Joseph Smith in 1827.

In 2016 this theory, which challenges the traditional paradigm of Central America as a primary location for Book of Mormon geography, was described as a "movement" among some Latter Day Saints. Proponents see this new model as a way of better supporting the historical authenticity of the Book of Mormon.

See also

Hopewell Culture National Historical Park
Newark Earthworks
Newark Holy Stones
Cumorah
Great Spirit
Archaeology and the Book of Mormon

Further reading
 Porter, Bruce H. and Meldrum, Rod L. (2009), Prophecies & Promises
 Meldrum, Rod L. (2011), Exploring the Book of Mormon in America's Heartland (Photobook)
  Ash, Michael R. (2001), Lehi of Africa (Review) |journal= FARMS Review of Books |volume= 13 |issue= 2 |pages= 5–20

 Hocking, David; Nelson, Rian; Neville, Jonathan; Meldrum, Rod; and Tuttle, Boyd J. (2018), Annotated Edition of the Book of Mormon (includes pictures and other visual media, which it presents as evidence for the Heartland Model, alongside the original Book of Mormon text

References

External links
 The Foundation for Indigenous Research and Mormonism (FIRM Foundation) online
 Book of Mormon Evidence online
 Original presentation by Rod Meldrum: "DNA Evidence for Book of Mormon Geography" DVD, on YouTube
 Lecture by Wayne May: "Book of Mormon Geography In North America", on YouTube
 Book of Mormon Evidence channel on YouTube
 Rod Meldrum's channel on YouTube
 Nephite Explorer online
 Page introducing Annotated Edition of the Book of Mormon (2018), contains visual and historical evidence in support of the Heartland Model

Archaeology of the United States
Book of Mormon places
Book of Mormon studies
Mormon apologetics
Mormonism-related controversies